John Norman (20 April 1883 – 9 August 1916) was a British cyclist. He competed in two events at the 1908 Summer Olympics.

Personal life
Norman served as a serjeant in the King's Regiment (Liverpool) during the First World War and was killed in action on 9 August 1916. He is commemorated on the Thiepval Memorial.

References

External links
 

1883 births
1916 deaths
British male cyclists
Olympic cyclists of Great Britain
Cyclists at the 1908 Summer Olympics
British Army personnel of World War I
King's Regiment (Liverpool) soldiers
British military personnel killed in World War I
People from Wallasey
Military personnel from Merseyside